The 1992 Pot Black was the second of the revived professional invitational snooker tournament and the 20th series altogether. It took place between 2 and 5 September 1992, and was broadcast in the autumn of the same year. The tournament was held in Blackpool, and featured sixteen professional players in a knock-out system.

This year, the series had been changed into a "timeframe" system which players would play at least one or two frames of snooker against the clock (each show was at least 20 minutes), the final being longer.

Broadcasts were shown on Mondays and Wednesdays and the series started at 15:00 on Monday 7 September 1992. Eamonn Holmes presented the series and Ted Lowe and Willie Thorne were the commentators with John Williams as referee.

Players in this year's series were the top 16 ranked players for the 1992–93 season except the No1 player Stephen Hendry and Darren Morgan. Replacing them were the first ever woman to play in series, Allison Fisher and the professional debut of the Junior Pot Black champion Ronnie O'Sullivan who beat defending Pot Black champion Steve Davis in the first show of the series. The final was won by Neal Foulds, beating debutant James Wattana

Tournament draw

References

Pot Black
Pot Black
Pot Black
Pot Black